ESPN is the Brazilian division of ESPN Inc. Launched in March 1989 as Canal+, it was the first country-specific version of ESPN outside the United States, launched in June 1995. The channel has covered major sporting events, like the 1996, 2000, 2004, 2008, 2012, and 2016 Summer Olympics; the 1998, 2006, 2010 and 2014 FIFA World Cup and the 1999, 2003 and 2007 Pan-American Games. High ratings and prestige in the segment have been marks of the channel; it also won the APCA award twice, in 1995 for "Best Sports Programming" and in 1998 for "Best Coverage of the 1998 FIFA World Cup".

Despite having a team that's regarded as one of the best in Brazilian sports broadcasting and important broadcasting rights for international competitions like La Liga, Premier League and the Bundesliga, major local series rights have historically not been present; the Campeonato Brasileiro, Copa do Brasil and the states' championships are held by local Grupo Globo and SporTV. ESPN, however, has purchased the rights to broadcast the 2009, 2010 and 2011 editions of the Copa do Brasil for TV and Campeonato Paulista, Copa Libertadores de América, Campeonato Brasileiro Série A and Copa Sudamericana for radio.

Brasil made a partnership with Rádio Eldorado to broadcast sports on radio. The new Rádio Eldorado ESPN used Eldorado's radio assets and the team of commentators from ESPN Brasil. It was renamed Rádio Estadão ESPN in 2007 due to a partnership agreement with the O Estado de S. Paulo newspaper.

In 2005 the company incorporated ESPN International coverage, starting to broadcast in two channels. Before this date, programs such as the SportsCenter International Edition, MLB and the NFL were transmitted directly from Bristol, Connecticut, with Portuguese audio from Andre Adler, Marco Alfaro, Sergio Cesario, Roby Porto, José Inácio Werneck, and Roberto Figueroa. Since 2005, shows and games are recorded and broadcast from its studios in São Paulo, though morning schedules continue to include USA and Latin American programs.

Prior to May 2011, programs produced by ESPN Brasil generally did not use in-game score graphics, though international programs had them. Beginning that month, ESPN Brasil began using the same score and other graphics used by the US channel.

In March 2012, the ESPN'S network in Brazil started with the broadcast 100% in HD with sports events and original programs. This is the same practice of ESPN in USA. The four channels of ESPN in Brazil is broadcast fully in HD.

In October 2013, ESPN launched a second screen app, ESPN Sync, to connect to broadcasts of football matches.

On May 6, 2020, Brazil's antitrust regulator CADE announced that ESPN and Fox Sports could merge their operations in Brazil together as of January 1, 2022 and not before, due to Fox Sports' broadcast rights and structure in the country, with ESPN taking over broadcast rights and structure after the merger.

In November 2021, it was announced that Disney would retire the ESPN Brasil brand after 26 years on air. ESPN Brasil would become ESPN, while the current ESPN would become ESPN 2, while the current ESPN 2 would become ESPN 3, and Fox Sports will become ESPN 4. Fox Sports 2 and ESPN Extra would not change their names. The change happened on January 17, 2022.

ESPN channels in Brazil 
Five separate channels of ESPN exist in Brazil:
 ESPN (formerly ESPN Brasil), the main channel, more football orientated with live debate, news, interviews and major international football games.
 ESPN2 (formerly ESPN), focused in US-based competitions (NBA, NFL and NHL).
 ESPN3 (formerly ESPN2), focused in extreme sports, MLB, tennis, rugby, cycling, golf and poker. 
 ESPN4 (formerly Fox Sports), focused in motorsport, boxing, MMA and international football.
 ESPN Extra, focused in extreme sports and wrestling.

ESPN Brazil significant programming rights

Football 
 UEFA Europa League
 UEFA Europa Conference League
 Copa Libertadores
 Copa Sudamericana
 Recopa Sudamericana
 Premier League
 EFL Championship
 EFL League One 
 EFL League Two 
 FA Cup
 EFL Cup
 EFL Trophy
 FA Community Shield
 FA Women's Super League
 Women's FA Cup
 Women's FA Community Shield
 La Liga 
 Segunda División
 Copa del Rey
 Supercopa de España
 Copa de la Reina de Fútbol
 Supercopa de España Femenina
 Serie A
 Women's Serie A
 Coppa Italia
 Coppa Italia (women)
 Supercoppa Italiana
 Supercoppa Italiana (women)
 German Cup
 Ligue 1
 Trophée des Champions
 Primeira Liga
 Taça de Portugal
 Taça da Liga
 Supertaça de Portugal
 Eredivisie
 Belgian First Division A
 Belgian Cup
 Belgian Super Cup
 Scottish Premiership
 Scottish Cup 
 Scottish League Cup
 Süper Lig
 Super League Greece
 UEFA Women's Championship
 FIFA World Cup qualification (UEFA) 
 UEFA European Championship qualifying
 UEFA Nations League
 Copa do Nordeste
 Argentine Primera División
 Supercopa Argentina
 FIFA World Cup qualification (CONCACAF)
 CONCACAF W Championship
 CONCACAF Nations League
 CONCACAF Champions League
 CONCACAF League 
 CONCACAF Under-20 Championship 
 Major League Soccer
 Liga MX (Only Atlético San Luis, Mazatlán and Puebla home matches)
 Florida Cup
 AFC Asian Cup
 AFC Women's Asian Cup
 FIFA World Cup qualification (AFC)
 AFC Champions League
 AFC Cup
 AFC U-23 Asian Cup
 AFC Futsal Asian Cup
 Australia Cup
 FIFA World Cup qualification (CAF)
 WAFU Nations Cup 
 Toulon Tournament
 Audi Cup 
 Bola de Prata

Action Sports 
 X Games

Badminton 
 Thomas Cup & Uber Cup
 BWF World Tour

Baseball 
 Major League Baseball
 World Baseball Classic
 Mexican League
 Little League World Series
 College baseball

Basketball 
 NBA
 FIBA Basketball World Cup
 FIBA Women's Basketball World Cup
 WNBA
 FIBA Intercontinental Cup
 Liga ACB
 Copa del Rey de Baloncesto
 Supercopa de España de Baloncesto
 Basketball Africa League
 College Basketball
 NBA Summer League
 NBA G League
 The Basketball Tournament
 NBB
 Basketball Champions League Americas

Boxing 
 ESPN Knockout

College Sports 
 National Collegiate Athletic Association events

Cricket 
 Cricket World Cup 
 ICC World Cup Qualifier 
 ICC World Twenty20 
 ICC T20 World Cup Qualifier 
 Under 19 Cricket World Cup 
 Australia national cricket team

Cycling 
 Tour de France
 Tour de France Femmes
 Vuelta a España
 Tour Down Under
 Paris–Nice
 Tour de Romandie
 Critérium du Dauphiné
 Tour de Suisse
 Vuelta a San Juan
 Tour Colombia
 Tour of Flanders
 Paris–Roubaix
 Liège–Bastogne–Liège
 Cadel Evans Great Ocean Road Race
 Omloop Het Nieuwsblad
 Gent–Wevelgem
 Dwars door Vlaanderen
 Amstel Gold Race
 La Flèche Wallonne
 Scheldeprijs 
 Brabantse Pijl
 Paris–Tours
 UCI Road World Championships 
 UCI Track Cycling World Championships 
 UCI BMX World Championships 
 UCI Mountain Bike World Championships

Futsal 
 UEFA Futsal Champions League

Golf 
 The Masters
 PGA Championship
 U.S. Open
 The Open Championship
 PGA Tour
 PGA European Tour
 World Golf Championships
 Presidents Cup
 Ryder Cup
 Senior PGA Championship
 U.S. Senior Open
 U.S. Women's Open
 U.S. Senior Women's Open
 U.S. Women's Amateur
 Senior Open
 Women's British Open
 Augusta National Women's Amateur
 Latin America Amateur Championship
 Asia-Pacific Amateur Championship
 Women's Asia-Pacific Amateur Championship

Gridiron Football 
 National Football League
 College Football

Handball 
 European Men's Handball Championship
 European Women's Handball Championship

Horse Racing 
 Kentucky Derby
 Preakness Stakes
 Belmont Stakes
 Pegasus World Cup
 Saudi Cup
 Dubai World Cup
 Grand National
 Epsom Derby
 Royal Ascot
 Irish Derby
 King George VI and Queen Elizabeth Stakes
 Haskell Stakes
 Sussex Stakes
 International Stakes
 Irish Champion Stakes
 British Champions Day
 Breeders' Cup
 Melbourne Cup
 Bahrain International

Ice Hockey 
 National Hockey League
 IIHF World Championship
 Champions Hockey League

Marathon  
 Tokyo Marathon
 Rotterdam Marathon
 Boston Marathon
 Hamburg Marathon
 Prague Marathon
 Stockholm Marathon
 Chicago Marathon
 Amsterdam Marathon
 New York Marathon
 Valencia Marathon

Mixed Martial Arts 
 Lux Fight League

Motorsport 
 MotoGP
 Moto2
 Moto3
 MotoE World Cup
 Dakar Rally
 IndyCar Series
 Indy Lights
 World Endurance Championship
 Extreme E
 TCR South America Touring Car Championship
 Deutsche Tourenwagen Masters
 Race of Champions

Multi-Sport Events 
 Special Olympics World Games
 World Games
 Commonwealth Games
 Universiade
 Aurora Games

Padel 
 Premier Padel 
 APT Padel Tour

Rugby Union 
 Rugby World Cup
 Six Nations Championship
 The Rugby Championship
 European Rugby Champions Cup
 European Rugby Challenge Cup
 Super Rugby Americas
 Super Rugby
 English Premiership
 United Rugby Championship
 Currie Cup
 National Provincial Championship
 Americas Rugby Trophy
 Women's Six Nations Championship
 Super Rugby Aupiki
 Farah Palmer Cup
 World Rugby Sevens Series
 World Rugby Women's Sevens Series
 World Rugby Sevens Challenger Series
 Top 12 de la URBA
 Campeonato Uruguayo de Rugby
 Test-matches

Sailing 
 America's Cup
 America's Cup Qualifiers and Challenger Playoffs
 America's Cup World Series

Skiing
 FIS Alpine Ski World Cup
 FIS Cross-Country World Cup
 FIS Freestyle Ski World Cup
 FIS Nordic Combined World Cup
 FIS Ski Jumping World Cup
 FIS Snowboard World Cup

Table Tennis 
 World Table Tennis Championships
 World Table Tennis
 Asian Cup Table Tennis Tournament 
 ITTF World Youth Championships

Tennis
 Australian Open
 Roland Garros
 Wimbledon
 U.S. Open
 ATP Finals
 ATP Tour Masters 1000
 ATP Tour 500
 ATP Tour 250
 WTA Finals
 WTA 1000
 WTA 500
 WTA 250
 Next Generation ATP Finals
 Laver Cup
 World Tennis Championship

Volleyball 
 FIVB Volleyball Women's Club World Championship
 Italian Volleyball League
 Athletes Unlimited Volleyball

Weightlifting 
 World Weightlifting Championships

Wrestling 
 WWE

Yachting 
 America's Cup
 America's Cup Qualifiers and Challenger Playoffs
 America's Cup World Series

Programs broadcast by ESPN Brazil 
Além da Bola
ATP Tour Uncovered
Bola da Vez
Cestou ESPN
Compacto NFL
Coppa Italia Show
Destaques da Libertadores
Destaques da UEFA Europa e Conference League
Destaques dos X Games
ESPN FC
ESPN Filmes
ESPN League
FA Cup Highlights
Futebol 90
Futebol 360
Inside Serie A
La Liga World
Linha de Passe
Mina de Passe
Momento ESPN
Mundo Premier League
NBA Action
Pelas Quadras
Premier League Stories
Prévia da Coppa Italia
Prévia da FA Cup
Resenha
Show da Rodada: Coppa Italia
Show da Rodada: La Liga
Show da Rodada: Ligue 1
Show da Rodada: Premier League
Show da Rodada: Serie A
SportsCenter Abre o Jogo
SportsCenter Brazil
SportsCenter U.S.
The Inside Line
UEFA Nations League: Match Day Highlights
UEFA Nations League: Match Night Highlights

ESPN Brazil staff 
Abel Neto - "Futebol 360" host
Airton Cunha - Tennis commentator
Alana Ambrósio - "Cestou ESPN" host
Alex Tseng - host
André Donke - soccer commentator
André Kfouri - Reporter; "ESPN League" and "SportsCenter" host
Amoroso - soccer commentator
André Linares - Reporter
André Plihal - "Resenha" and "Bola da Vez" host
Antero Greco - Soccer commentator and "SportsCenter" host
Antonio Martoni - Rugby commentator
Antony Curti - NFL, College Football and MLB commentator; "ESPN League" co-host
Ari Aguiar - Play-by-play announcer and "ESPN League" host
Bruno Vicari - "SportsCenter" host
Carlos Eugênio Simon - referee commentator
Celso Unzelte - soccer commentator
Christian Fittipaldi - IndyCar Series commentator
Cícero Mello - Reporter
Cledi Oliveira - Play-by-play announcer
Daniela Boaventura - "Futebol 90" host
Diego Lugano - soccer commentator and "Resenha" and "ESPN FC" co-host
Djalminha - soccer commentator and "Resenha" co-host
Edgard Mello Filho - Motorsport commentator
Eduardo Affonso - Reporter
Eduardo Agra - NBA and College Basketball commentator
Eduardo de Menezes - Reporter and "Além da Bola" host
Eduardo Elias - "SportsCenter" host
Eugênio Leal - soccer commentator
Fábio Luciano - soccer commentator
Fausto Macieira - MotoGP commentator
Felipe Motta - "SportsCenter" host
Fernando Campos - soccer commentator
Fernando Nardini - Play-by-play announcer and "SportsCenter" co-host
Fernando Saraiva - soccer commentator
Gian Oddi - Soccer commentator
Gláucia Santiago - "SportsCenter" host
Gustavo Berton - Reporter
Gustavo Hofman - Soccer commentator
Gustavo Zupak - Soccer commentator
Hamilton Rodrigues - Play-by-play announcer
Hugo Botelho - Play-by-play announcer
João Castelo Branco - Reporter
José Roberto Lux "Zé Boquinha" - NBA and College Basketball commentator
Juliana Tesser - MotoGP commentator
Léo Bertozzi - Soccer commentator
Leonardo Gaciba - referee commentator
Luciana Marianno - Play-by-play announcer
Luciano Amaral - "SportsCenter" host; E-Sports host
Luciano "KDRA" Lancelotti - Action sports commentator
Luiz Carlos Largo - Play-by-play announcer
Marcela Rafael - "SportsCenter" host
Mariana Spinelli - "SportsCenter" host
Mario Marra - soccer commentator
Matheus Pinheiro - Play-by-play announcer
Matheus Suman - Play-by-play announcer
Maurício Bonato - Play-by-play announcer
Mauro Naves - soccer commentator
Mendel Bydlowski - Reporter
Natalie Gedra - Reporter
Osvaldo Pascoal - soccer commentator
Paulo Andrade - Play-by-play announcer and "Linha de Passe" host
Paulo Antunes - NFL and MLB commentator; "ESPN League" co-host
Paulo Calçade - Soccer commentator
Paulo Mancha - NFL and College Football commentator
Paulo Soares - Play-by-play announcer and "SportsCenter" host
Pedro Henrique Torre - Reporter
Rafael Marques - soccer commentator
Rafael Reis - Reporter
Raphael Prates - soccer commentator
Renan do Couto - Play-by-play announcer
Renan Rocha - Play-by-play announcer
Renata Ruel - referee commentator
Renato Rodrigues - soccer commentator
Ricardo Bulgarelli - NBA commentator
Ricardo Melo - golf commentator
Roberta Barroso - Reporter
Rodrigo Bueno - soccer commentator
Rogério Vaughan - Play-by-play announcer
Rubens Pozzi - Reporter and Sportscenter co-host
Silas Pereira - soccer commentator
Thiago Alves - Play-by-play announcer and Motorsport commentator
Thiago Simões - Soccer and NHL commentator
Ubiratan Leal - Soccer and MLB commentator
Vinicius Moura - Play-by-play announcer
Vinicius Nicoletti - Reporter
Victor Martins - Motorsport commentator
Weinny Eirado - NFL, MLB and College Football commentator
William Tavares - "Futebol 360" host; play-by-play announcer and "Linha de Passe" co-host
Wlamir Marques - FIBA Basketball commentator
Zé Elias - soccer commentator
Zinho - soccer commentator

See also 
ESPN
ESPN (Latin America)
ESPN International

References

External links 
  ESPN Brazil official site
 
 
 
 

ESPN Latin America
Brasil
Television stations in Brazil
Portuguese-language television networks
Television channels and stations established in 1995
1995 establishments in Brazil
Sports television networks in Brazil
Sports television networks
The Walt Disney Company Latin America